Wieleń   is a town in Czarnków-Trzcianka County, Greater Poland Voivodeship, Poland. It is situated on the river Noteć.

History

Part of Poland since the Middle Ages, Duke Władysław Odonic of Greater Poland brought the Cistercians to Wieleń in 1239. Wieleń was a private town of Polish nobility, including the Czarnkowski and Sapieha families, administratively located in the Poznań County in the Poznań Voivodeship in the Greater Poland Province of the Polish Crown. Zofia Czarnkowska erected the early Baroque Church of the Assumption of the Virgin Mary and a hospital in Wieleń, and Piotr Paweł Sapieha built a Baroque palace.

As a result of the First Partition of Poland, in 1772 it was annexed by Prussia, under the Germanized name Filehne. In 1807, it was regained by Poles and included in the newly established Duchy of Warsaw. After its dissolution in 1815, it was re-annexed by Prussia, and from 1871 to 1919 it was also part of Germany. Until 1919, Filehne was the capital of the Filehne district in the Bromberg administrative region in the Prussian Province of Posen. According to the census of 1905, the town had a population of 4,407, of which 3,748 (85%) were Germans.

After World War I, in 1918, Poland regained independence, and the Greater Poland Uprising broke out, whose goal was to reunite the region with Poland. On January 18, 1919, the town was captured by Polish insurgents, and afterwards most of the town was restored to Poland and became part of the Poznań Voivodeship. The border between Germany and Poland ran along the Noteć river and therefore, the small part of the town lying north of the river, including the Prussian Eastern Railway station of Filehne Nord remained in Germany as part of the Netzekreis district in the Prussian Province of Grenzmark Posen-West Prussia. Gradually, new building activities began in the German part of Filehne, and people (some of whom had lost their properties in the Polish part) were successfully settled, with subsidies from the state. In 1925, only 62 inhabitants lived here, in 1933 there were 749. On December 23, 1927, the German part of Filehne became an independent municipality with the name Deutsch Filehne. In 1937, the name was shortened to Filehne.

After the joint German-Soviet invasion of Poland, which started World War II in 1939, it was occupied by Germany until 1945. Towards the end of World War II, the town was occupied by the Red Army and was restored to Poland in its entirety. The remaining German population was expelled in accordance with the Potsdam Agreement.

Historical monuments 
 Baroque Sapieha Palace (18th century)
 Baroque Church of the Assumption of the Virgin Mary and Saint Michael (1615–1630)
 Bismarck Tower (1902)

Sports
It competes in the lower leagues.

People 
 Moritz Lazarus (born 1824 here–1903), Jewish philosopher
 Abraham Baer (1834–1894), Jewish Kantor 
 Joseph S. Manasse (1831–1897), early settler of San Diego, California
 Louis Waldenburg (1837–1881), German physician
 Aron Freimann (1871–1948), Jewish bibliographer, historian
 Residents
 Hermann Wilhelm Ebel
 , Polish teacher, soldier, poet, author of the Polish scout anthem, principal of the local Polish gymnasium in 1926–1928

Further reading
Wieleń In: Geographical Dictionary of the Kingdom of Poland: Słownik geograficzny Królestwa Polskiego, Warszawa : Druk «Wieku», 1893. — Т. XIII. p. 312

References

External links 
 Wieleń's City Department
 High School in Wieleń
 M-GOK Wieleń

Cities and towns in Greater Poland Voivodeship
Czarnków-Trzcianka County
Poznań Voivodeship (1921–1939)
Shtetls